Luke John Anthony Gosling,  (born 17 September 1971) is an Australian politician and a retired Australian Army officer. Gosling has been the Australian Labor Party member for the Australian House of Representatives seat of Solomon in the Northern Territory since the 2016 federal election.

Background
Gosling is the eldest of eight children. He has a Bachelor of Arts in history and politics from the University of New South Wales.

Gosling served in the Australian Defence Force (ADF) for 13 years in the Parachute Infantry, Commandos and Defence Cooperation Programs. He served in Papua New Guinea, Malaysia and Timor-Leste.

Gosling worked abroad in countries such as Afghanistan, Cambodia, Albania and Timor-Leste after leaving the ADF. He co-founded Life, Love and Health, a not-for-profit, non-governmental organisation, an Australian charity for Timor-Leste. For his work with the NGO, he was awarded the Medal of the Order of Australia in 2006 regarding relief work in the 2006 humanitarian crisis. He received the Medal of Merit from the President of Timor-Leste in 2009.

Gosling established the Remote Area Health Corps in 2008. He has worked at Saint Vincent de Paul as a volunteer after serving as the Darwin CEO of the organisation.

Political career

2013 election
Gosling ran for the Darwin-based seat of Solomon as a Labor candidate at the 2013 federal election, but was narrowly defeated by one-term Country Liberal incumbent Natasha Griggs. Gosling received a 48.6 percent two-party vote after gaining a 0.4-point two-party swing.

2016 election
Gosling ran for Solomon again at the 2016 federal election. A MediaReach seat-level opinion poll of 513 voters in Solomon conducted one week before the Saturday 2 July 2016 election found Gosling heavily leading Griggs 61–39 on the two-party vote from a large 12.4-point swing.

Gosling defeated Griggs on 56 percent two-party vote after gaining a 7.4-point two-party swing. He is the second opposition member to hold Solomon. The federal election came at a bad time for the CLP government in the Territory, whose poll numbers had suffered after numerous cabinet reshuffles and leadership spills. Gosling's victory foreshadowed his party's landslide victory at the 2016 Territory election, at which Labor won the third-largest majority government in the history of the Territory–including all but one seat within Solomon's borders.

Gosling made national headlines during the election campaign by using photographs from his past army service in his campaign materials. The Australian Defence Force issued a directive to retract any advertising showing him in military uniform. Gosling defended use of the photographs, stating the claimed restrictions on their use did not apply as he was "no longer a member of Defence".

2022 election
Gosling was re-elected for a third term after defeating CLP candidate Tina MacFarlane at the 2022 federal election.

Personal life
Gosling is married and has two children.

References

1971 births
Living people
Members of the Australian House of Representatives for Solomon
Australian Labor Party members of the Parliament of Australia
Labor Right politicians
Recipients of the Medal of the Order of Australia
21st-century Australian politicians
Australian Army officers
University of New South Wales alumni